The Walter Venus was a seven-cylinder, air-cooled, radial engine for aircraft use, built in Czechoslovakia in the late 1920s.

Applications
 Aero A.34
 ANBO V
 Savoia-Marchetti S.56A

Specifications

See also

References

 
 Němeček, V. (1968). Československá letadla. Praha: Naše Vojsko.
 moraviation.com

1920s aircraft piston engines
Venus
Aircraft air-cooled radial piston engines